Jean-Baptiste Edmond Fleuriot-Lescot or Lescot-Fleuriot (1761 in Brussels – 28 July 1794 in Paris) was a Belgian architect, sculptor, and a revolutionary. 

He lived to be only 33 years old.

Public Appointments
He was mayor of Paris for 2 months and 18 days in 1794.

He was elected March 13, 1793 substitute Fouquier-Tinville, public prosecutor of the Revolutionary Tribunal.

Fleuriot-Lescot was appointed commissioner of public works,, the 21st floréal ( May 10, 1794). He kept the town hall for 2 months and 18 days.

The French Revolution
On the 9th of Thermidor, he published (with Hanriot and Payan) a proclamation, in which he excited the people "to rise en masse to defend their true friends." 

Fleuriot-Lescot hastily assembled the council of the Commune, as Robespierre was shut up in the Luxembourg Palace; declared insurrectionary views, and delivered the decrees of charge. 

At this time Robespierrists were welcomed to the Common House. 

The Convention struck a decree outlawing the mayor, and all the council of the commune. 

Fleuriot-Lescot (and 50 others) were arrested at two o'clock in the morning by the gendarmes, who remained faithful to the Convention, led by Leonard Bourdon. 

He appeared before the Revolutionary Tribunal on the 10th of Thermidor, and was identified by Lieudon, who demanded against him to replace Fouquier-Tinville. 

Fleuriot-Lescot was sentenced to the guillotine; among 21 other convicts that day were Robespierre, Saint-Just, and Couthon. 

1761 births
Architects from Brussels
Architects of the Austrian Netherlands
Belgian sculptors
Executed Belgian people
Mayors of Paris
People executed by guillotine during the French Revolution
1794 deaths